The discography of American indie rock band My Morning Jacket consists of nine studio albums, 12 extended plays, 22 singles, five music videos, three compilation albums, seven live albums, and one video album. The band signed with independent Darla Records in 1998 before moving to ATO in 2003.

Albums

Studio albums
{| class="wikitable plainrowheaders" style="text-align:center;"
|+ List of studio albums, with selected chart positions, sales figures and certifications
! scope="col" rowspan="2" style="width:10em;" | Title
! scope="col" rowspan="2" style="width:15em;" | Album details
! scope="col" colspan="10" | Peak chart positions
|-
! scope="col" style="width:3em;font-size:90%;" | US<ref name="US200">{{cite magazine |url=https://www.billboard.com/artist/my-morning-jacket/chart-history/tlp/ |title=My Morning Jacket Chart History: Billboard 200 |magazine=Billboard| accessdate=August 7, 2020}}</ref>

! scope="col" style="width:3em;font-size:90%;" | BEL

! scope="col" style="width:3em;font-size:90%;" | CAN

! scope="col" style="width:3em;font-size:90%;" | IRE

! scope="col" style="width:3em;font-size:90%;" | NLD

! scope="col" style="width:3em;font-size:90%;" | NOR

! scope="col" style="width:3em;font-size:90%;" | SCO

! scope="col" style="width:3em;font-size:90%;" | SPA

! scope="col" style="width:3em;font-size:90%;" | SWE

! scope="col" style="width:3em;font-size:90%;" | UK
|-
! scope="row" | The Tennessee Fire|
 Released: June 18, 1999
 Label: Darla
 Formats: CD, LP, download
| — || — || — || — || — || — || — || — || — || —
|-
! scope="row" | At Dawn|
 Released: April 6, 2001
 Label: Darla
 Formats: CD, LP, download
| — || — || — || — || — || — || — || — || — || 189
|-
! scope="row" | It Still Moves|
 Released: September 9, 2003
 Label: ATO
 Formats: CD, LP, download
| 121 || — || — || — || — || — || 56 || — || 53 || 62
|-
! scope="row" | Z|
 Released: October 4, 2005
 Label: ATO
 Formats: CD, LP, download
| 67 || 71 || — || — || — || — || 64 || — || — || 74
|-
! scope="row" | Evil Urges|
 Released: June 10, 2008
 Label: ATO
 Formats: CD, LP, download
| 9 || 34 || — || — || 70 || — || — || — || 55 || 125
|-
! scope="row" | Circuital|
 Released: May 31, 2011
 Label: ATO
 Formats: CD, LP, download
| 5 || 61 || 15 || 75 || 91 || 22 || 59 || 67 || 12 || 60
|-
! scope="row" | The Waterfall 
|
 Released: May 4, 2015
 Label: ATO
 Formats: CD, LP, download
| 11 || 49 || 20 || 30 || 48 || — || 33 || 82 || 38 || 42
|-
! scope="row" | The Waterfall II 
|
 Released: July 10, 2020
 Label: ATO
 Formats: CD, LP, download
| 117 || 134 || — || — || — || — || — || — || — || —
|-
! scope="row" | My Morning Jacket|
 Released: October 22, 2021
 Label: ATO
 Formats: LP, download
| 49 || — || — || — || — || — || 66 || — || — || —
|-
| colspan="13" style="font-size:90%"| "—" denotes a recording that did not chart or was not released in that territory.
|}

Live albumsOkonokos (September 26, 2006; US #131)iTunes Live from Las Vegas Exclusively at the Palms (January 13, 2009; US #94)Celebración de la Ciudad Natal (April 18, 2009, Record Store Day 2009 exclusive; US #158)My Morning Jacket Live at 9:30 Club (January 26, 2011)Henry Fonda Theatre - Los Angeles, CA (2005) (October 2, 2020)The Tabernacle - Atlanta, GA (2006) (October 2, 2020)Ascend Amphitheater - Nashville, TN (2015) (October 2, 2020)Live 2015 (September 3, 2021)Live from RCA Studio A (Jim James Acoustic) (June 18, 2022, Record Store Day 2022 exclusive)

Compilation albumsEarly Recordings: Chapter 1: The Sandworm Cometh (November 2004)Early Recordings: Chapter 2: Learning (November 2004)At Dawn/Tennessee Fire Demos Package (June 2007)

Video albumsOkonokos (DVD, October 2006)

Extended playsHeartbreakin Man (May 2000)My Morning Jacket Does Bad Jazz (July 2000)We Wish You a Merry Christmas and a Happy New Year! a.k.a. My Morning Jacket Does Xmas Fiasco Style! (October 2000, US version)We Wish You a Merry Christmas and a Happy New Year! a.k.a. My Morning Jacket Does Xmas Fiasco Style! (December 2000, EU version)My Morning Jacket Does Gold Hole (January 2001)Split EP (with Songs: Ohia) (April 2002)Chocolate and Ice (April 2002)Sweatbees (November 2002; UK version)Sweatbees (May 2003; Australian version)Acoustic Citsuoca (May 2004)
Off the Record EP (October 2005)iTunes Session (December 2011; US #191)

Singles

Other releases

Music videos

Compilation appearancesLittle Darla Has a Treat for You Vol. 14 (2000)Louisville Is for Lovers Vol. 1 (February 2001)2 Meter Sessies Volume 10 (September 2001)Louisville Is for Lovers Vol. 2 (February 2002)KVRX 91.7 FM presents local live v.6 unlimited bandwidth (June 2002)ATO Records 53 (October 2002)A Gift from a Garden to a Flower: A Tribute to Donovan (November 2002)Oxford American 2003 Southern Music CD No. 6 (2003)The Mother Lodge: A Tribute to the Rudyard Kipling, Volume 1 (March 2003)Live from Bonnaroo 2003 (October 2003)X-Ray CD #10 (October 2003)270 Miles from Graceland – Bonnaroo 2003 DVD (November 2003)ATO Records 54 (December 2003)Live @ The World Café Volume 18: I'll Take You There (September 2004)KCRW Sounds Eclectic 3 (October 2004)SPUNK Days of Future Past: "The Way That He Sings" (October 2004)KEXP presents Music That Matters Vol. 1 (November 2004)KFOG Live from the Archives 11 (November 2004)The WIRED CD: Rip. Sample. Mash. Share.: "One Big Holiday" (November 2004)Louisville Is for Lovers Vol. 5 (February 2005)duyster. (March 2005)Return to Sin City – A Tribute to Gram Parsons DVD (March 2005)Bonnaroo Music Festival 2004 (April 2005)Live from Bonnaroo 2004 DVD (May 2005)Live at KEXP Volume One (June 2005)MOJO: Dylan Covered: M. WARD, CONOR OBERST & JIM JAMES – "Girl From The North" Country(August 2005)Elizabethtown: Songs from the Brown Hotel EP (August 2005)Austin City Limits Music Festival – Live from Austin, Texas 2004 (August 2005)Austin City Limits Music Festival – Live from Austin, Texas 2004 DVD (August 2005)Elizabethtown: Music from the Motion Picture: "Where to Begin" (September 2005)For a Decade of Sin: 11 Years of Bloodshot Records (October 2005)MOJO: Born in the USA Volume 2: The New American Songbook: JIM JAMES "Sooner (live)" (December 2005)Elizabethtown: Music from the Motion Picture – Vol. 2 (February 2006)Louisville Is for Lovers Vol. 6 (February 2006)On XRT: Live from the Archives, Volume 9 (October 2006)Endless Highway: The Music of The Band: "It Makes No Difference" (January 2007)Paste Magazine New Music Sampler – Issue 44 (July 2008)Dark Was the Night – A Red Hot Compilation: "El Caporal" (February 2009)Twistable, Turnable Man: A Musical Tribute to the Songs of Shel Silverstein (June 2010)Muppets: The Green Album: "Our World" (August 2011)Beale Street Music Festival Bud Light Stage May 4th, 2012*Wrote a Song for Everyone: "Long as I Can See the Light", with John Fogerty (May 2013)Dallas Buyers Club (Music From and Inspired By the Motion Picture)'': "Ready to Be Called On" (October 2013)

Notes

References

External links
 
 "From Nashville to Kentucky", the My Morning Jacket illustrated discography 1995–2006
 "I Will Be There When You Die", the My Morning Jacket live archive 1999–2004
 My Morning Jacket collection at the Internet Archive's live music archive
 

Discography
Discographies of American artists
Rock music group discographies